is a shōnen science fiction manga by George Manabe. It was published in the United States and Canada in English by Dark Horse Comics.

Plot
Wataru and his partner Babo, two black market merchants with no morals to speak of, get caught up in a battle between the Helgebard Empire and the mysterious girl Mian Toris. To reward Wataru for saving her life, Mian collars both Wataru and Babo and declares them to be her pets. While dragging them across the continent, they learn that Mian's destination is a head-on confrontation with Shion, the empress of the Helgebard Empire itself, at Kyuraweil Keep.

Characters
Wataru
A human black marketeer and partner of Babo who gets caught up in Mian's scheme to destroy the Helgebard Empire.
Mian Toris
A young lady whose sword can even destroy armored tanks. In reality, she is a "Breaker", a highly advanced combat android with enhanced physical capabilities.
Babo
An Akogi businessman of non-existent moral character, motivated only by the acquisition of more wealth.
Empress Shion
Supreme commander of Helgebard; she rules with an iron fist but her fate seems inextricably bound with Mian's.

References

External links

Shōnen manga
1986 manga
Dark Horse Comics titles